Erhard von Redwitz, O. Cist. (died 1502) was a Roman Catholic prelate who served as Auxiliary Bishop of Mainz (1494–1502).

Biography
Erhard von Redwitz was ordained a priest in the Cistercian Order. On 14 Feb 1494, he was appointed during the papacy of Pope Alexander VI as Auxiliary Bishop of Mainz and Titular Bishop of Venecompensus. On 16 Jun 1495, he was consecrated bishop. He served as Auxiliary Bishop of Mainz until his death on 30 Sep 1502.

See also 
Catholic Church in Germany

References

External links and additional sources
 (for Chronology of Bishops) 
 (for Chronology of Bishops) 
 (for Chronology of Bishops)  

15th-century German Roman Catholic bishops
16th-century German Roman Catholic bishops
Bishops appointed by Pope Alexander VI
1502 deaths
Cistercian bishops